Thais Fermo (born 11 June 1996) is a Brazilian handball player for BM Porriño and the Brazilian national team.

She represented Brazil at the 2021 World Women's Handball Championship in Spain.

References

1996 births
Living people
Brazilian female handball players
Expatriate handball players
Brazilian expatriate sportspeople in Spain
20th-century Brazilian women
21st-century Brazilian women